The Dover Phillies were a minor league baseball team that played in Dover, Delaware as part of the Eastern Shore League. Dover first played in 1889 as members of the Delaware State League. The Eastern Shore League team began as the Dover Senators (or Dobbins) from 1923–1926 and then returned as the Dover Orioles (an affiliate of the Baltimore Orioles of the International League) from 1937–1940. Then after World War II they became a Philadelphia Phillies affiliate from 1946–1948.

References

External links
Baseball Reference

Defunct Eastern Shore League teams
Philadelphia Phillies minor league affiliates
Defunct baseball teams in Delaware
Dover, Delaware
1923 establishments in Delaware
1948 disestablishments in Delaware
Baseball teams established in 1923
Sports clubs disestablished in 1948
Baseball teams disestablished in 1948